World Taekwondo, called the World Taekwondo Federation until June 2017, is an international federation governing the sport of taekwondo and is a member of the Association of Summer Olympic International Federations (ASOIF). 

The World Taekwondo Federation was established on May 28, 1973, at its inaugural meeting held at the Kukkiwon with participation of 35 representatives from around the world.  there are 212 member nations. Since 2004, Choue Chung-won has been the president of World Taekwondo, succeeding the first president, Kim Un-yong.

On July 17, 1980, the International Olympic Committee recognized World Taekwondo at its 83rd Session in Moscow, Russia. Taekwondo debuted as a demonstration sport of the 1988 Summer Olympics in Seoul, South Korea. On September 4, 1994, Taekwondo was adopted as an official Sport of the 2000 Summer Olympics at the 103rd IOC Session in Paris, France. According to World Taekwondo, Taekwondo is one of the most systematic and scientific Korean traditional martial arts, that teaches more than physical fighting skills. It is a discipline that shows ways of enhancing our spirit and life through training our body and mind. Today, it has become a global sport that has gained an international reputation, and stands among the official games in the Olympics.

The body was renamed World Taekwondo in June 2017 to avoid the "negative connotations" of the acronym associated with the common internet slang WTF.

Organizational structure
The main constituents of World Taekwondo are the following: The General Assembly (GA); the World Taekwondo Council; the President and the Secretariat. In addition to its main constituents World Taekwondo also encompasses other organizations that have been duly authorized or recognized by the Council and the GA and that operate under the auspices of World Taekwondo. World Taekwondo-recognized or authorized organizations include but are not limited to the Continental Unions. The General Assembly is the general meeting of the council and representatives of MNAs of World Taekwondo. The GA is World Taekwondo's supreme decision making organ. Its decisions are final, whereas the Council consists of the President, the Vice Presidents, the Secretary General, the Treasurer and the Council members. Responsibilities of the council are for example planning and management of World Taekwondo organization and operations and the control over the financial budget and financial reports. The President is elected by the GA from among its members for a term of four years. The President must lead and represent World Taekwondo; concurrently lead the GA and the council as its chairman, and preside over meetings and other activities as well as designate official duties to Vice Presidents on an ad-hoc basis for the betterment of the development of the sport of taekwondo and World Taekwondo operations. Furthermore, the President appoints the chairmen and members of World Taekwondo Committees. Lastly, the Secretariat of World Taekwondo is installed at the location of World Taekwondo headquarters for the execution of the secretarial affairs and duties of the President and the Secretary General.

History
World Taekwondo was established on May 28, 1973, at the inaugural meeting held at the Kukkiwon with participation of 35 representatives from the world after it separated from the International Taekwon-Do Federation because of political reasons. At that time, Un Yong Kim was elected president for a four-year term. One of the main Constituents of World Taekwondo, the Secretariat was formed on June 3, 1973, and began operating. On October 8, 1974, World Taekwondo was affiliated to the General Association of International Sports Federations (GAISF), now SportAccord. Until the 1980s, the European (May, 1976), the Asian (October, 1976), the Pan American (September, 1978) and the African (April, 1979) Taekwondo Unions inaugural meetings were held, while Oceania's Taekwondo Union was not recognized as the 5th Continental Union of World Taekwondo until July 16, 2005. The recognition of the IOC towards World Taekwondo at its 83rd session in Moscow on July 17, 1980, was the cornerstone for their Cooperation. Thereupon Taekwondo participated in the 24th Olympiad at Changchung Gymnasium in Seoul, Korea as well as the 25th Olympiad at the Palau Blaugrana in Barcelona, Spain as a demonstration sport. In recognition of his contribution to the Olympic Movement Un Yong Kim was awarded the Order of Commander by Prince Rainier of Monaco on September 21, 1993. Moreover, Taekwondo was adopted as an official sport of the 2000 Summer Olympics at the 103rd IOC session in Paris, France, on September 4, 1994. Half a year later, on February 15, 1995, World Taekwondo was affiliated with the Association of Summer Olympic International Federations (ASOIF) as a provisional member. After the first appearance of Taekwondo as an Olympic Sport in the 2000 Summer Olympics, the IOC executive board confirms Taekwondo as an Olympic Sport for the 2004 Summer Olympics on December 11–13, 2000. Furthermore, the inclusion of taekwondo in the 2008 Summer Olympics was confirmed on November 29, 2002, at the 114th IOC session held in Mexico City. On February 15, 2004, the Vice President (Italy) Sun Jae Park was elected as Acting President of World Taekwondo due to the resignation of the founding President Un Yong Kim from the presidency of World Taekwondo. Four month later Chung Won Choue was elected as new President of World Taekwondo at the extraordinary General Assembly on June 11, 2004. Taekwondo was confirmed as program of the 2012 Summer Olympics on July 8, 2005.

Mission and objectives
The mission of World Taekwondo is to provide effective international governance of Taekwondo as an Olympic sport and Paralympic sport. The envisioned objectives of World Taekwondo are to promote, expand, and improve worldwide the practice of taekwondo in light of its educational, cultural, and sports values (the "Taekwondo movement") and to promote fair play, youth development, and education as well as to encourage peace and cooperation though participation in sports. Moreover, World Taekwondo wants to promote or sanction international taekwondo competitions and relating to those World Taekwondo resolves to constantly improve technical rules regulating taekwondo competitions and poomsae competitions sanctioned or promoted by World Taekwondo, including the taekwondo event of the Olympic Games and Paralympic Games. Furthermore, World Taekwondo wants to take action in order to strengthen the unity and protect the interests of World Taekwondo and the Taekwondo Movement as well as to engage in other activities in support of the above objectives. World Taekwondo undertakes its missions and objectives in cooperation with independent affiliated organizations including World Taekwondo Academy, World Taekwondo Peace Corps, World Taekwondo Demonstration Team, Pro Taekwondo Federation, Global Taekwondo Support Federation and Taekwondo International Federation.

Membership 
As of 2022, the global membership of World Taekwondo stands at 212 national member associations, spanning five continents.

Continental Federations
 The Pan American Taekwondo Union (PATU)
45 national member associations
 	The European Taekwondo Union (ETU)
 	51 national member associations
 	The African Taekwondo Union (AFTU)
 	52 national member associations
 	The Asian Taekwondo Union (ATU)
      43 national member associations
 Oceania Taekwondo Union (OTU)
      19 member national associations

National Associations

Sparring

Under World Taekwondo and Olympic rules, sparring is a full-contact event and takes place between two competitors on a matted 8 meter octagon. 

Scoring of valid points is determined by using the electronic scoring system installed in what World Taekwondo designates as "Protector and Scoring Systems" (PSS). In events where the PSS are used, all scoring is determined by judges using manual scoring devices.

There are now two alternate forms of contest.

Standard form 
At the end of three rounds, the athlete with the most points is declared the winner. A tie, however, results in an additional round, known as "Golden Point". If no point is scored during the Golden Point, the player with the most registers on the PSS is declared the winner. If one athlete is knocked out, or is otherwise unable to continue as a result of a legal technique by his opponent, the other athlete is automatically awarded the victory.

Best of three system 
In the best of three system, the duration of the contest comprises three rounds of two minutes each. The contestant with the most number of points per round wins the round. The winning contestant is the one who wins the most number of rounds out of three.

Points 
Points are awarded for permitted, accurate, and powerful techniques to the legal scoring areas; light contact does not score any points. Points are awarded as follows:
 1 point for a strike to the chest or when "Gam-jeom" is given to the opponent
 2 points for a standard kick to the chest
 3 points for a standard kick to the head
 4 points for a turning kick to the chest
 5 points for a turning kick to the head
The competition sparring rules were updated by World Taekwondo General Assembly in November 2016 in order to upgrade the sport so that it "dazzles and excites." Changes include encouraging more offensive actions with modifications to some of the point scoring and by disallowing certain leg blocks, elimination of mid-game interruptions, and improvements that simplify penalty assessment and foster better officiating. These new rules took effect in January 2017.

Beginning in 2009, a kick or punch that makes contact with the opponent's hogu (the body guard that functions as a scoring target) scores one point; if a kick to the hogu involved a technique that includes fully turning the attacking competitor's body, so that the back is fully exposed to the targeted competitor during execution of the technique (spinning kick), an additional point is awarded; a kick to the head scores three points; as of October 2010 an additional point is awarded if a turning kick was used to execute this attack. Punches to the head are not allowed. As of March 2010, no additional points are awarded for knocking down an opponent (beyond the normal points awarded for legal strikes).

The referee can give penalties (called "gam-jeom") at any time for rule-breaking, such as hitting an area not recognized as a target, falling, or stalling the match.

Until 2008, if one competitor gained a 7-point lead over the other, or if one competitor reached a total of 12 points, then that competitor was immediately declared the winner and the match ended. These rules were abolished by World Taekwondo at the start of 2009. In October 2010 World Taekwondo reintroduced a point gap rule. Under the new rule if a competitor has a 12-point lead at the end of the second round or achieves a 12-point lead at any point in the third round then the match is over and the athlete in the lead is declared the winner.

World Taekwondo-sanctioned events allow any person, regardless of school affiliation or martial arts style, to compete in World Taekwondo events as long as he or she is a member of World Taekwondo Member National Association in his or her nation. These National Associations are open for anyone to join.

WT World Ranking
As of the rules established in 2017, it has been arranged a new grading for competitions that will award points to the best placed athletes. Previously the maximum was G10, now it was doubled to G20. The "G" value of a tournament is used to calculate how many points an athlete is awarded for winning a tournament. For example, the Olympics as a G-20 tournament is worth five times as many points to the athlete as a Continental Championship (a G-4 tournament). To compete on a WT Ranking-Points Competition the athletes need a Global License, which allows them to secure points on any country that hosts a tournament and it's affiliated with WT.

The points awarded to the athletes are given within the following formula:

 Rank of Athlete within the tournament x Grade of Tournament

Where, generally, excluding the Summer Olympics where players tie at the same place due to the repechages:

 The first-place athlete is said to have a "rank" of 10 within the tournament
 The second-place athlete is said to have a rank of 6 within the tournament (60% of first-place)
 The third-place athlete is said to have a rank of 3.6 within the tournament (60% of second-place)
 The fourth-place athlete is said to have a rank of 2.16 within the tournament (60% of third-place)

Thereafter (generally) the percentage used is 70% rather than 60%

Example:

An athlete places 3rd at a G-8 event. Then the athlete is awarded:

(10 points x 60% x 60%) x 8 = 28.8 points.

Attrition of Athlete Points
When an athlete is awarded points at a Ranking-Point Tournament, those points remain attached to that athlete for four years. During a four-year period, points are deducted from the athletes rank after each completed year by 25% of the initial points.

References

External links
 

 
Sports organizations established in 1973
Taekwondo
1973 establishments in South Korea
Organizations based in Seoul